Sandy skate may refer to either of these fish species:
Leucoraja circularis, found in the northeast Atlantic and Mediterranean
Pavoraja arenaria, found off the western coast of Australia